Lucia Paulina Keijser (1875-1958) was a Dutch painter known for her floral still lifes.

Biography 
Keijser was born on 9 December 1875 in Amsterdam. Keijser was married twice; first to G. L. Wittig and after his death to R. Ruijneman.

Keijser's work was included in the 1939 exhibition and sale Onze Kunst van Heden (Our Art of Today) at the Rijksmuseum in Amsterdam.

Keijser died on 26 January 1958 in Laren, North Holland.

References

External links 
images of Keijser's art on Invaluable

1875 births
1958 deaths
Painters from Amsterdam
20th-century Dutch women artists
20th-century Dutch painters